Repercussions were an American R&B, soul and acid jazz group of the 1990s at Giant Step, formed by former Groove Collective members, New York native vocalist, rapper, drummer and music producer Genji Siraisi. (who is Japanese American and Russian), Russian/Jewish vocalist Itaal Shur,  African-American R&B singers Nicole Willis and Mark Anthony Jones, African-American percussionist Gordon "Nappy G" Clay and Jewish American bass player Jonathan Maron  The group also consisted of other underground soul and jazz musicians and performers in the New York area. The group released two albums, which only their debut did somewhat moderately well commercially. Other members include Aya, Andy Faranda, and Daniel Wyatt.

Career
Genji Sirasi, who was a former member of Groove Collective, formed his own musical ensemble, putting together former Groove Collective members, Itaal Shur, Nicole Willis, Mark Anthony Jones, Gordon "Nappy G" Clay and Jonathan Maron. The group Repercussions would not have the same impact as Groove Collective, but the musical style was basically identical.

The group was signed to Warner Bros. records, and in 1995 released their debut album Earth and Heaven, (which peaked somewhat moderately well on Billboard urban charts).

They later released a second album on Pony Canyon (released only in Japan for unknown reasons) titled "Charmed Life". Several members from the first album parted ways with the group, and new members, vocalist Lysa "Aya" Treiner, guitarist Andy Faranda, and DJ Daniel Wyatt joined the group. After the release of this album, the group disbanded.

Discography

Albums

Singles

References

American contemporary R&B musical groups
American soul musical groups
Musical groups established in 1994
Musical groups disestablished in 2000
Acid jazz ensembles
Warner Records artists
Musical groups from New York (state)